Synchlora bistriaria, the oblique-striped emerald, is a species of emerald moth in the family Geometridae.

The MONA or Hodges number for Synchlora bistriaria is 7065.

References

Further reading

External links

 

Synchlorini
Articles created by Qbugbot
Moths described in 1876